Castulus (died 286) is venerated as a martyr and saint.  According to tradition, he was the chamberlain (or officer, valet) of Emperor Diocletian and the husband of Irene of Rome.

Biography
A convert to the Christian religion, he sheltered Christians in his home and arranged for religious services inside the palace of the emperor.  Among those he sheltered were Mark and Marcellian.  He is one of the saints associated with the life and legend of Sebastian.

With his friend Tiburtius, he converted many men and woman to Christianity and brought them to Pope Caius to be baptized.  He was betrayed by an apostate named Torquatus and taken before Fabian, prefect of the city.     

Castulus was tortured and executed by being buried alive in a sand pit on the Via Labicana.  According to tradition, Irene subsequently buried the body of the martyred Sebastian.  She was later martyred herself, around 288 AD.

Veneration
A church dedicated to him at Rome, built on the site of his martyrdom, existed from at least the seventh century.

Castulus was venerated in Bavaria after relics of his were taken to Moosburg.  Duke Heinrich der Löwe started the construction of the Kastulus Minster in 1171.

In 1604, some relics were also brought to Landshut.  His relics still rest in Landshut's church of St. Martin's and Kostel Sv. Haštala (Church of St.Castulus), Prague.

References

External links
St. Castulus
 Castulus (Kastulus)
 SV. HAŠTAL (KASTUL)
 San Castulo, Mártir

286 deaths
Converts to Christianity from pagan religions
Culture of Altbayern
3rd-century Romans
3rd-century Christian martyrs
Deaths by live burial
Year of birth unknown